Campbelltown is an unincorporated community and census-designated place (CDP) in Lebanon County, Pennsylvania, United States. The population was 3,616 at the 2010 census. It is located east of Hershey at the intersection of U.S. Route 322 and Pennsylvania Route 117 and is located in the Harrisburg metropolitan area.

Geography
Campbelltown is located in southwestern Lebanon County at  (40.278200, -76.584149), in the northern part of South Londonderry Township. It is bordered to the west by Hershey in Dauphin County.

U.S. Route 322 passes through the center of Campbelltown, leading west through the southern part of Hershey  to Harrisburg, the state capital. To the east US-322 leads  to Ephrata in Lancaster County. PA-117 crosses US-322 on the eastern edge of Campbelltown; it leads north  to Palmyra and southeast  to Mount Gretna.

Spring Creek rises in the community and flows northwest to Swatara Creek, a tributary of the Susquehanna River.

Demographics

As of the census of 2000, there were 2,415 people, 900 households, and 682 families residing in the CDP. The population density was 836.2 people per square mile (322.6/km). There were 939 housing units at an average density of 325.1/sq mi (125.4/km). The racial makeup of the CDP was 97.1% White, 0.8% African American, 1.0% Asian, 0.3% from other races, and 0.9% from two or more races. Hispanic or Latino of any race were 0.8% of the population.

There were 900 households, out of which 38.3% had children under the age of 18 living with them, 64.4% were married couples living together, 8.6% had a female householder with no husband present, and 24.2% were non-families. 21.2% of all households were made up of individuals, and 7.7% had someone living alone who was 65 years of age or older. The average household size was 2.61 and the average family size was 3.05.

In the CDP, the population was spread out, with 27.0% under the age of 18, 5.1% from 18 to 24, 33.0% from 25 to 44, 22.3% from 45 to 64, and 12.6% who were 65 years of age or older. The median age was 37 years. For every 100 females, there were 92.6 males. For every 100 females age 18 and over, there were 86.3 males.

The median income for a household in the CDP was $55,625, and the median income for a family was $66,452. Males had a median income of $45,306 versus $29,659 for females. The per capita income for the CDP was $22,827. None of the families and 0.9% of the population were living below the poverty line, including no under eighteens and none of those over 64.

Campbelltown tornadoes
On July 14, 2004, around 3 pm, a tornado warning was issued by the National Weather Service for Lebanon County. A few moments later, an F3 tornado with winds over  struck the extreme southeast part of the village. No deaths occurred, but several minor to moderate injuries were treated. It is the largest and most expensive tornado to have struck Lebanon County.

On June 22, 2010, an EF0 tornado touched down in Campbelltown. This weak tornado did not cause as much damage as the one in 2004.

See also
 – A World War II Royal Navy destroyer used in the St Nazaire Raid whose bell was donated to the municipality after the war

References

Populated places established in 1759
Census-designated places in Lebanon County, Pennsylvania
1759 establishments in Pennsylvania
Census-designated places in Pennsylvania